Zephyr High School is a public high school located in unincorporated Zephyr, Texas (U.S.) and classified as a 1A school by the UIL. It is part of the Zephyr Independent School District located in eastern Brown County. In 2015, the school was rated "Met Standard" by the Texas Education Agency.

Athletics
The Zephyr Bulldogs compete in these sports - 

Basketball
Cross Country
6-Man Football
Golf
Track and Field

Zephyr recently built a new football field complete with an artificial surface (2009)

This stadium is home to Tapps Division 1, 2, and 3 state championships.

Division I        7 pm       December 5

Division II       12 pm     December 6

Division III      6 pm       December 6

References

External links
 Zephyr ISD website
List of Six-man football stadiums in Texas

Schools in Brown County, Texas
Public high schools in Texas
Public middle schools in Texas